Whigville may refer to:

 Whigville, Connecticut, a hamlet in the town of Burlington

 Whigville, Michigan, an unincorporated community in Genesee County
 Whigville, Ohio, an unincorporated community in Noble County